Steve Keen (born 28 March 1953) is an Australian economist and author. He considers himself a post-Keynesian, criticising neoclassical economics as inconsistent, unscientific and empirically unsupported. The major influences on Keen's thinking about economics include John Maynard Keynes, Karl Marx, Hyman Minsky, Piero Sraffa, Augusto Graziani, Joseph Alois Schumpeter, Thorstein Veblen, and François Quesnay. Hyman Minsky's financial instability hypothesis forms the main basis of his major contribution to economics which mainly concentrates on mathematical modelling and simulation of financial instability. He is a notable critic of the Australian property bubble, as he sees it.

Keen was formerly an associate professor of economics at University of Western Sydney, until he applied for voluntary redundancy in 2013, due to the closure of the economics program at the university. In autumn 2014, he became a professor and Head of the School of Economics, History and Politics at Kingston University in London. He was also a fellow at the Centre for Policy Development.
He has since taken retirement and is crowd source funded to undertake independent research as well as being a Distinguished Research Fellow at the Institute for Strategy Resilience & Security, University College London.

Early life and education
Keen was born in Sydney in 1953. His father was a bank manager. Keen graduated with a Bachelor of Arts in 1974 and a Bachelor of Laws in 1976, both from the University of Sydney. He then completed a Diploma of Education at the Sydney Teachers College in 1977.

In 1990, he completed a Master of Commerce in economics and economic history at the University of New South Wales. He completed his PhD in economics at the University of New South Wales in 1997.

Economics

Financial instability and debt deflation
Most of Steve Keen's recent work focuses on modeling Hyman Minsky's financial instability hypothesis and Irving Fisher's debt deflation. The hypothesis predicts an overly large private debt to GDP ratio, can cause deflation and depression. Here, the falling of the price level results in a continually rising real quantity of outstanding debt. Moreover, the continued deleveraging of outstanding debts increases the rate of deflation. Thus, debt and deflation act on and react to one another, resulting in a debt-deflation spiral. The outcome is a depression.

Debunking Economics
Keen's full-range critique of neoclassical economics is contained in his book Debunking Economics. Keen presents a wide variety of critiques on neoclassical economic theory.  He argues they show neoclassical assumptions which are fundamentally flawed. Keen claims several neoclassical assumptions are empirically unsupported (that is, they are unsupported by observable and repeatable phenomena) nor are they desirable for society at large (that is, they do not necessarily produce either efficiency or equity for the majority). He argues economists' overall conclusions are very sensitive to small changes in these assumptions.

Keen has attempted to counter Karl Marx's theory (in his view Marx's pre-1857 view, specifically) from a post-Keynesian perspective, by arguing machines can add more product-value over their operational lifetime than the total value of depreciation charged "during those asset lives". 

For example, the total value of sausages produced by a sausage machine over its useful life might be greater than the value of the machine. Depreciation, he implies, was the weak point in Marx's social accounting system all along. Keen argues all factors of production can add new value to outputs. However he gives credit to Marx for contributing to the "financial instability hypothesis" of Hyman Minsky.

Keen's book closes with a survey of various schools of heterodox economics, concluding "None of these is at present strong enough or complete enough to declare itself a contender for the title of 'the' economic theory of the 21st century." However, he argues neoclassical economics is a degenerative research program, not generating new knowledge.  It primarily grows a belt of protective auxiliary hypotheses to shield its core beliefs from critique. There is an accompanying website which provides more detailed mathematical expositions.

Critique of neoclassical theory of the firm 
Keen has challenged the core, elementary textbook neoclassical theories of Perfect competition and Monopoly, and in particular the argument that firms in "perfect competition" and monopolies are usefully thought of as representing polar opposites. Keen has referred to this as "the theory of the firm." Neoclassical textbooks define a firm acting without any strategic awareness of the effect of its output choice on price as representing "perfect competition" and argue that this condition of "perfect competition" can be represented analytically by a horizontal demand curve facing the firm -- the firm acts as if it believes it can sell whatever it produces at the currently prevailing price, but nothing at any higher price; marginal costs for this firm, it is presumed, are rising and the firm does not want to sell more at the current price or a lower price. Something like such a state of affairs, it is sometimes argued, is approached as the number of firms competing in a market approaches infinity and the effect of any one firm's output decision on the overall market price becomes infinitesimal and can be practically disregarded by the individual firm in its decision-making. By contrast a firm with strategic awareness that its output decision markedly affects the market price, faces, presumptively, a downward-sloping demand curve: expanding the rate of output sold depresses market price. In general, elementary neoclassical textbook presentations hold that all "profit-maximizing" firms will set marginal revenue equal to marginal cost. For the firm in "perfect competition", this means price = marginal revenue = marginal cost = average (unit) cost and no profit. For the "monopoly" firm aware that its output choice affects price, the "profit-maximizing" choice is to choose a rate of output where marginal cost = marginal revenue, but in the monopolist's case, that will mean constraining output to raise price above marginal cost. 

Keen challenges the theory and pedagogy of the polar opposition of "perfect competition" and "monopoly" from multiple angles, arguing that the traditional theoretical pedagogy is contradictory and incoherent taken as a whole. He shows that the number of firms in a market is practically irrelevant to whether the firm's output choice affects the overall market price in the simplified (and practically unlikely) case of uniform firm cost structures and a downward-sloping market demand curve. He goes on to explore various scenarios by which multiple firms might arrive at an "equilibrium" market price and level of output. Keen further notes that cost structures are rarely uniform and that in the presence of significant economies from scale of production, a so-called "monopoly" realizing such economies of scale would be led to higher output and lower price than a large number of competing firms unable to realize such economies of scale. Keen also takes note of empirical evidence that many actual business firms are producing in a range of output where marginal cost may be less than average cost and falling, and firms openly desire to produce and sell more at current prices.

Keen's article on "profit maximisation, industry structure, and competition" has had counter-arguments by Paul Anglin. Chris Auld has additionally claimed to show that Keen & Standish's arguments are inconsistent with standard assumptions used in perfect competition, and their analysis uses calculus improperly.

Politics
In August 2015, Keen endorsed Jeremy Corbyn's campaign in the Labour Party leadership election. As of October 2021, Keen plans to run as a senate candidate in the 2022 Australian federal election for The New Liberals in New South Wales.

Views on the UK's EU referendum
Keen was in favour of the UK leaving the European Union, stating  mainstream economists were over-certain and exaggerating the likely effects following the country's withdrawal. Keen regards the open-borders free-movement policy of the EU as precipitate and unsustainable in the absence of a common fiscal policy; all the more so, given how migrants impose burdens on public services in destination countries also experiencing austerity. 

He also states the Euro is destined to fail, not least because of the way it penalises recession-hit countries unable to pursue expansive fiscal policy, and indeed considers the whole EU project as a failed one destined for collapse.

Minsky software project
Recently, Keen commissioned the development of a software package called Minsky for visually modelling national economies, in a way that is intended to be more accurate than mainstream macroeconomic models – which he contends do not properly include debt and banking. He envisages it being used for both educational and research purposes.

The first phase of the development was funded by an academic research grant, as is typical for academic research projects – but in February 2013 Keen launched a crowdfunding project on Kickstarter to allow members of the public to contribute towards taking MINSKY to the next level of development. In the first 24 hours, this project raised approximately 15% of its funding target, and has since fully achieved its initial funding goal of $50,000.00.

Criticism
Matthijs Krul maintains that Keen, while broadly accurate in his criticism of the neoclassical synthesis, generally misrepresents Marx's views in Debunking Economics and in earlier work when asserting that, in the production of commodities, machinery produces more value than it costs.

Austrian School economists Robert P. Murphy and Gene Callahan claim Keen's 2001 book "suffers from many of the very faults of which he accuses the mainstream". They also claim that much of his work is "ideologically motivated even while criticising neoclassical economics for being ideological". They praise his critique of perfect competition and his chapter on dynamic vs. static models, whilst they criticise his attempts at objective value theory and what they claim is his misrepresentation of the Austrian School interpretation of Say's law.

Other publications
 Keen, Steve (2021). The New Economics. A manifesto. Polity. .
 Keen, Steve (2017). Can We Avoid Another Financial Crisis? Polity. .
 Keen, Steve (2015). Developing an economics for the post-crisis world. World Economics Association and College Publications. .
 Lee, Frederic S. and Steve Keen (2004): "The Incoherent Emperor: A Heterodox Critique of Neoclassical Microeconomic Theory", Review of Social Economy, V. 62, Iss. 2: 169–199
 Co-editor of: Commerce, Complexity and Evolution: Topics in Economics, Finance, Marketing, and Management: Proceedings of the Twelfth International Symposium in Economic Theory and Econometrics. New York: Cambridge University Press. .
 The Debunking Economics Podcast: with Phil Dobbie and Prof. Steve Keen (http://debunkingeconomics.com)

See also
 Paul Ormerod
 Hyman Minsky

References

External links

 Steve Keen's Patreon posts
 Steve Keen's Debtwatch blog
 
 Steve Keen at the Institute for New Economic Thinking

1953 births
Living people
Australian economists
Australian expatriates in the United Kingdom
Post-Keynesian economists
Academic staff of Western Sydney University